The Bridge of Sighs (Italian: Ponte dei Sospiri) is a bridge in Venice, Italy. The enclosed bridge is made of white limestone, has windows with stone bars, passes over the Rio di Palazzo, and connects the New Prison (Prigioni Nuove) to the interrogation rooms in the Doge's Palace. It was designed by Antonio Contino, whose uncle Antonio da Ponte designed the Rialto Bridge. It was built in 1600.

Etymology 
The view from the Bridge of Sighs was the last view of Venice that convicts saw before their imprisonment. The bridge's English name was bequeathed by Lord Byron in the 19th century as a translation from the Italian "Ponte dei sospiri", from the suggestion that prisoners would sigh at their final view of beautiful Venice through the window before being taken down to their cells.

In culture

Numerous other bridges around the world have been nicknamed after the Bridge of Sighs — see Bridge of Sighs (disambiguation).

The 1861 opera Le pont des soupirs ("The Bridge of Sighs") by Jacques Offenbach has the name of the bridge as a title.

The Bridge of Sighs features heavily in the plot of the 1979 film A Little Romance. One of the characters tells of a tradition that if a couple kiss in a gondola beneath the Bridge of Sighs in Venice at sunset while the church bells toll, they will be in love forever.

Bridge of Sighs is the name of the second solo studio album released in April 1974 by English rock guitarist and songwriter, Robin Trower.

A Bridge of Sighs is mentioned in the opening line of “Itchycoo Park” by the Small Faces

Marillion, an English progressive rock band, mentions this particular bridge in their song Jigsaw. ('We are renaissance children becalmed beneath the Bridge of Sighs').

Giles Corey, an American slowcore band, likewise mentions this bridge in their song No One Is Ever Going To Want Me.

Renowned American architect H. H. Richardson used the bridge as inspiration when designing part of the Allegheny County Jail complex in 
Pittsburgh, PA. It was completed in 1888 and features a similar enclosed arched walkway that connects the courthouse and jail, therefore bearing the same name.

Gallery

See also
 Bridge of Lies – another bridge with legends regarding its name
 List of buildings and structures in Venice

References

External links

 Bridge of Sighs, Venice
 
 
 

Sighs
Sighs
Sighs
Sighs
Sighs
Tourist attractions in Venice
1602 establishments in the Republic of Venice
1602 establishments in Italy